FC Alma-Ata (Alamty Fýtbol Klýby) was a Kazakh association football club based in Almaty between 2000 and 2008.

History 
In 2000 the club was formed as FC Tsesna in Almaty. Tsesna played in the Kazakhstan First Division for the first time in 2003, finishing second and earning themselves promotion to the Kazakhstan Premier League. Following their promotion, the club's management changed the club's name to FC Alma-Ata, finishing their debut season in 18th position under the management of Edgar Gess. The following season, first under Igor Romanov, and then Antonius Joore, the club improved and finished 13th. The 2006 was the club's best season, again with Antonius Joore as their manager, the club finished 5th in the league and won the Kazakhstan Cup for the first time. As a result of their Cup win, they qualified for the 2007–08 UEFA Cup for the first time.

In July 2007 Alma-Ata appointed Arno Pijpers as a consultant, whilst he continued his Kazakhstan National Team duties, in preparation for their debut UEFA Cup matches against Slovakian side ViOn Zlaté Moravce. Alma-Ata were defeat by ViOn Zlaté Moravce 4–2 over the two legs, whilst finishing 6th in the league and reaching the Last 32 of the Cup. The 2008 season was the club's last season, as after finishing 8th in the League and as Cup runners-up, Alma-Ata declared themselves bankrupt and ceased operations, with the majority of the club's staff joining FC Megasport before forming FC Lokomotiv Astana.

Names
2000 : Founded as Tsesna
2004 : Renamed Alma-Ata

Domestic history

Continental history

Honours
Kazakhstan Cup (1) 2006

References

See also
 Kazakhstan football clubs in European cups

Alma-Ata, FC
Alma-Ata, FC
2000 establishments in Kazakhstan
Alma-Ata, FC
Alma-Ata, FC